Italian is the only official language of San Marino.

Use of the Sammarinese dialect of Romagnol is more common among elderly individuals. Conservation is critical, to the point it is estimated to go extinct after 2040.

References